Fakhruddin Ali Ahmed (13 May 1905 – 11 February 1977) was an Indian lawyer and politician who served as the fifth president of India from 1974 to 1977.

Born in Delhi, Ahmed studied in Delhi and Cambridge and was called to the bar from the Inner Temple, London in 1928. Returning to India, he practiced law in Lahore and then in Guwahati where he went on to become the Advocate General of Assam in 1946. Beginning a long association with the Indian National Congress in the 1930s, Ahmed was finance minister of Assam in the Gopinath Bordoloi ministry in 1939 and again from 1957 to 1966 under Bimala Prasad Chaliha. He was made a cabinet minister by Prime Minister Indira Gandhi in 1966 and was in charge of ministries including Power, Irrigation, Industries and Agriculture until 1974 when he was elected president of India.

As president, Ahmed imposed the Emergency in August 1975 and gave his assent to numerous ordinances and constitutional amendments that severely restricted civil liberties and allowed Indira Gandhi to rule by decree. Lampooned in an iconic cartoon by Abu Abraham, Ahmed’s legacy is tarnished by his support for the Emergency and he has been described as a rubber stamp president.

Ahmed died in February 1977, was accorded a state funeral and is buried in a masjid near Parliament House in New Delhi. Ahmed, who was the second Muslim to become the president of India, was also the second president to die in office. Ahmed was succeeded by B. D. Jatti as acting president and by Neelam Sanjiva Reddy as the sixth president of India in 1977.

Early life and family 
Ahmed’s grandfather, Kaliluddin Ali Ahmed, was an Islamic scholar and his father, Col. Zalnur Ali was a doctor who belonged to the Indian Medical Service and is thought to be the first medical graduate from Assam. Ahmed’s mother, Sahibzadi Ruqaiyya Sultan, was a daughter of the Nawab of Loharu. Ahmed was born in Hauz Qazi, Delhi on 13 May 1905 and was one of ten children, including five sons, of Colonel Ali. In 2018 it emerged that several of Ahmed's relatives were left out of the National Register of Citizens for Assam as they could not produce documents to prove their antecedents.

Education and legal career
Ahmed attended Government High Schools in Gonda, United Provinces and in Delhi and attended St. Stephen's College, Delhi during 1921–22, before leaving for England where he passed his history tripos from St Catharine's College, Cambridge in 1927. He was called to the Bar from the Inner Temple, London in 1928. He returned to India the same year and practiced law at the Lahore High Court before moving to Guwahati in 1930 where he worked initially as a junior lawyer under Nabin Chandra Bardoloi. At Guwahati, Ahmed, who became the Advocate General for the state, was the founding president of the Bar Association of the Assam High Court after its formation in 1948.

Role in the Indian National Congress
Ahmed joined the Indian National Congress as a primary member in 1931 and was a member of the Assam Pradesh Congress Committee, the Working Committee of the Assam Pradesh Congress Committee and the All India Congress Committee from 1936 onwards, except for short breaks. He was a member of the Working Committee of the All India Congress Committee in 1946–47 and again from 1964 to 1974 during which period he was also a member of the Parliamentary Board of the party.

Electoral career in pre-Independence India
Ahmed was elected to the legislative assembly of Assam in the provincial elections of 1937 which were held in accordance with the Government of India Act, 1935. He was one of three Muslim ministers in the Congress government headed by Gopinath Bordoloi, serving as Minister for Finance, Revenue and Labour from 20 September 1938 to 16 November 1939. In his budget for 1939–40, Ahmed introduced several new taxes including an agricultural income tax, taxes on amusements and betting and a tax on sale of goods in an effort to eliminate the state’s revenue deficit. The tax on agricultural income imposed a levy on the profits of the tea industry, a part of which was to be used for the welfare of workers in the tea plantations. This, and the pro-labour stance he took during the strike in the Assam Oil Company, was deemed inimical to British commercial interests in Assam but won much public support for the Bordoloi Ministry.

Congress Ministries across India resigned in protest against the Viceroy Lord Linlithgow's action of declaring India a belligerent in the Second World War without consulting them. In 1940, Ahmed was arrested and imprisoned for a year when he performed a satyagraha on Gandhi’s behest. After the launch of the Quit India Movement, Ahmed along with several other leaders of the Assam Provincial Congress Committee was arrested on 9 August 1942. He was detained as a security prisoner for a further three years at the jail in Jorhat.

Ahmed was opposed to the Muslim League’s demand for Pakistan and to the Partition of India along communal lines. However, in the elections of 1946, while the Congress won the majority of seats to form a government in Assam under Gopinath Bordoloi, Ahmed was defeated in the North Kamrup constituency by the Muslim League’s Moulvi Abdul Hye. Although the Congress Party under Gopinath Bordoloi spent much money and effort to secure Ahmed’s victory, he won only 844 votes against the 7,265 votes polled by Hye. Ahmed was thereafter appointed the Advocate General of Assam, a post he held until 1952.

Career in independent India 
Although he was offered a seat in the legislative assembly elections of 1952, Ahmed refused to contest the elections due to disagreements with the leadership of the Congress party and the Chief Minister Bishnuram Medhi. In April 1954, he was elected to the Rajya Sabha and was its member until he resigned in March 1957. He contested and won the 1957 Assam Legislative Assembly election from Jania winning 66.13% of the votes cast and was re-elected to the seat in the 1962 Assam Legislative Assembly election improving his majority by winning 84.56% of the votes. Under the governments headed by Chief Minister Bimala Prasad Chaliha, Ahmed served as Minister of Finance, Law, Community Development, Panchayats and Local Self Government during 1957-1962 and was the Minister of Finance, Law, Community Development and Panchayats during 1962-66.

Ahmed facilitated the entry of Muhammed Saadulah, the Muslim League leader who preceded Gopinath Bordoloi as Assam's Prime Minister, into the Congress Party in 1951. Ahmed played a role in frustrating Chief Minister Chaliha’s attempts at enforcing the Prevention of Infiltrators Plan which, based on the National Register of Citizens, 1951, sought to identify and deport illegal migrants to Assam. He argued that if the Congress Party were to continue with this plan, it would lead to its loss of support among Muslims in Assam and across the rest of India. He has been accused of thus allowing the steady influx of Muslims from East Pakistan who became a votebank for the Congress Party. Salman Khurshid has identified this strategy, which he attributes to Ahmed, as one of the factors that led to the Nellie Massacre.

Union Minister

Minister of Irrigation and Power 
In January 1966, while serving as Assam's Finance Minister, Ahmed was appointed the Union Minister for Irrigation and Power in Indira Gandhi’s first cabinet as one of a handful of ministers she brought to Shastri's cabinet which remained largely unchanged under her. In April of that year, he was elected to the Rajya Sabha for a second time.

Minister of Education
He was shifted to the Ministry of Education, succeeding M.C. Chagla, and served as the Union Minister for Education between 13 November 1966 and 12 March 1967. In his brief period in that Ministry, Ahmed voiced concerns over the reduced allocations made to the Ministry and its likely impacts on educational reconstruction programs and oversaw the Amending Bill of 1966 to the Banaras Hindu University Act.

Minister of Industrial Development and Company Affairs 
Ahmed was made the Minister of Industrial Development and Company Affairs on 13 March 1967. In the parliamentary elections of 1967 Ahmed was elected to the Lok Sabha from the Barpeta constituency in Assam winning over 60% of the votes. It was during Ahmed's tenure as Minister of Industrial Development that his ministry, through the Directorate General of Technical Development, issued a letter of intent to Sanjay Gandhi to manufacture 50,000 Maruti cars annually even though Gandhi lacked the technical expertise and the capital required for establishing such a venture.

In 1969, Ahmed introduced a bill in Parliament seeking to ban corporate funding to political parties. The bill, which sought to amend the Companies Act, 1956, aimed to curb the influence of large businesses on the political establishment as also to hamstring the centre-right Swatantra Party by preventing its access to funding. The ban, introduced without establishing an alternative financing mechanism, resulted in the abolishment of the key legal source of election funds for parties and the proliferation of illegal practices in campaign funding.

In September 1969, Ahmed was sent to Rabat, Morocco as head of the Indian delegation at the Islamic Summit held there. However, upon his arrival in Morocco the Indian delegation was barred from attending the summit on the objections of the Pakistani delegation led by General Ayub Khan. The incident proved to be a diplomatic fiasco for India and led to a vote of censure in Parliament, which was defeated by the Government with the help of the communist and regional parties as the Congress Party's own strength in Parliament had reduced following the August split in the party.

Minister for Food and Agriculture 
Ahmed was appointed Minister for Food and Agriculture on 27 June 1970, serving in that office till 3 July 1974. He was re-elected from the Barpeta constituency in the general election of 1971, winning over 72% of the votes polled. In May 1971, he was also made the minister in charge of wakf under the Muslim Wakfs Act, 1954. In 1971 the Central Land Reforms Committee was constituted with Ahmed as its chairman with the aim of helping the state governments undertake comprehensive land reform. The recommendations of the committee included fixing land ceilings at the level of the family, restrictively defining the family to include only a husband, wife and their minor children, and fixing ceilings between 10 and 18 acres of land for different types of land. Its recommendations paved the way for introduction of agricultural land ceilings in state legislations and the realization of 2.7 million hectares of excess land of which 53% was subsequently redistributed among people from the Scheduled Castes and Scheduled Tribes.

As minister, Ahmed supported the creation of food and fertilizer buffer stocks to meet shortfalls in production as also various crop research programmes and the increased availability of power to the agricultural sector. The nationalization of wholesale trade in wheat by the government of India was implemented under Ahmed in 1973. Although it was aimed at preventing market distortions and ensuring stability of prices, the policy proved disastrous, leading to lower procurements and the running down of buffer stocks forcing the import of over 60 lakh tonnes of grain at high prices. Consequently, the proposals to extend it to the trade in rice and for the wheat crop of April 1974 were abandoned.

President of India (1974–1977)

Election as president
In July 1974, Ahmed was chosen by Indira Gandhi and the Congress Party as their candidate to be the next President of India. In doing so, they overlooked the then Vice President, Gopal Swarup Pathak, who had been elected to that post in 1969 with the support of the Congress Party. Polling for the 1974 Indian presidential election was held on 17 August in a direct contest between the Congress Party’s Ahmed and the opposition candidate Tridib Chaudhuri, a Lok Sabha MP from the Revolutionary Socialist Party. Ahmed won 7,65,587 or 80.18% of the 9,54,783 votes cast against Chaudhuri’s 1,89,196 and he was declared elected on 20 August.

Ahmed was sworn in as the fifth president of India on 24 August 1974, becoming the second Muslim to hold that office and the first person to be directed elevated to the presidency from the Union Cabinet. Ahmed’s election was challenged unsuccessfully before India's Supreme Court by Charu Lal Sahu, an advocate-on-record.

Promulgation of the Emergency
Ahmed imposed a national emergency under Article 352 of India’s Constitution late in the night of 25 June 1975 on the advice of Prime Minister Indira Gandhi. The legality of its imposition – on the ground that "a grave emergency exists whereby the security of India is threatened by internal disturbances." – was questionable as there were no reports to that effect from the Intelligence Bureau, the Home Ministry or from any or the governors of the states nor had the proposal for its promulgation been considered by the Union Council of Ministers. Although the constitutional impropriety was pointed out to him, Ahmed raised no questions and chose to sign the order imposing the emergency, a draft of which was brought to him by the Prime Minister’s personal secretary, R. K. Dhawan.

In the early hours of the next day, electricity supply was cut off to newspaper offices in Delhi and the main leaders of opposition parties placed under arrest. The Cabinet met at 7AM on 26 June, where it was informed by the prime minister of the imposition of emergency the previous night. Prime Minister Gandhi subsequently addressed the nation on All India Radio announcing the Emergency, beginning with the words "The President has proclaimed an emergency. This is nothing to panic about." The Emergency which lasted until 21 March 1977 saw the suppression of civil liberties, the arrest of opposition politicians and clampdown on political parties, the suspension of fundamental rights guaranteed by the Indian Constitution and the muzzling of the media, and has been described as a period of darkness for India’s democracy.

Ordinances and Constitutional Amendments
The two-thirds majority enjoyed by the Congress Party in India’s Parliament allowed it to undertake several wide-ranging constitutional amendments. The Prime Minister also instructed Ahmed to issue ordinances, sidestepping Parliament and allowing for rule by decree. In August 1975, the thirty-eighth and thirty-ninth Constitutional Amendment Bills passed by Parliament received presidential assent. The 38th Amendment precluded the Emergency and the ordinances passed during this period from judicial review whereas the 39th Amendment barred the courts from adjudicating election petitions filed against the president, the vice president, the prime minister and the speaker of the Lok Sabha and rendered any pending proceedings before the courts null and void.

Ordinances issued in 1975 included one abolishing bonded labour, the Equal Remuneration Ordinance which provided for equal pay for equal work or work of similar nature, the amendment to the Conservation of Foreign Exchange and Prevention of Smuggling Activities Act, 1974 allowing detention of offenders for a period of two years,  the amendment to the Import and Export (Controls) Act increasing the severity of penalties for offences relating to the misuse of import licences and imported goods among scores of other ordinances issued during the year. In December 1975, while President Ahmed was on a state visit to Egypt and Sudan, the government dispatched a special courier carrying three executive ordinances preventing the publication of material deemed objectionable by the government, abolishing the Press Council of India and lifting immunities on media’s coverage of Parliament. These were promptly signed in Cairo by the President. The first session of Parliament in 1976 therefore had to consider and replace with acts the numerous ordinances issued since the proclamation of Emergency in June 1975.

In January 1976, President’s rule was declared in Tamil Nadu after Ahmed by ordinance dismissed its government, headed by Chief Minister M. Karunanidhi, and dissolved the state’s legislative assembly. By two ordinances issued in March 1976, the responsibility of maintaining government accounts were taken away from the Comptroller and Auditor General of India and vested with the accounts offices of individual government departments, while making the Comptroller and Auditor General responsible for the audit of these accounts. In June 1976, an ordinance extended by a year the validity of provisions allowing the government to detain any person for up to one year without disclosing the grounds for detention to the detainee under the Maintenance of Internal Security Act. In December 1976 the Forty-second Constitutional Amendment Bill received President Ahmed's assent. The bill passed by both houses of Parliament in November amended as many as 53 articles of the Constitution and the Preamble, besides introducing a new section containing the Fundamental Duties of citizens. Furthermore, it sought to severely circumscribe the powers of the Supreme Court, to transfer several responsibilities hitherto entrusted with the state governments to the Central government thus weakening India's federal structure and extended the tenure of the Lok Sabha to six years.

Support for the Emergency
As president, he publicly spoke in favour of the imposition of Emergency throughout this period. In his address to the nation on Independence Day, 1975 he assured citizens that the Emergency was a "passing phase" and its imposition was necessary to save India from chaos and disruption. He also cautioned that liberty should not "degenerate into licence" and exhorted the nation to focus on increasing production. Elsewhere, he reiterated that the "Emergency is a passing phase but the era of permissive politics and national degeneration is over and we will never allow that phase to be repeated again" and that the indiscipline and disorder brought about by reactionary forces had slowed down India’s development. Addressing the nation on Republic Day, 1976, Ahmed said that the Emergency had helped India’s economy and brought about "national discipline at all levels". On the Independence Day in 1976, he stated that the Emergency would not be used to switch over from the parliamentary to a presidential system of government or to accumulate more power than was permitted under the Constitution and that it had been issued instead “to bring about such economic, social and political changes as have become relevant and necessary in the interests of the people of India”.

In private, Ahmed appeared to have misgivings about the Emergency. This was revealed in an embassy cable (disseminated by Wikileaks) sent from the United States Embassy in Delhi in August 1976 which suggested an estrangement between Ahmed and Prime Minister Indira Gandhi. The cable noted Ahmed’s growing concern that Indira and Sanjay Gandhi were "pushing too hard on the political and Constitutional system of India" and reported that he had rebuffed her suggestion to replace the Vice-President, B.D. Jatti with her former defence minister, Swaran Singh. Indira Gandhi’s proposal to replace her entire cabinet with younger ministers was also cautioned against by Ahmed who warned her that that this would jeopardize the unity of the Congress Party. The cable went on to note that Ahmed was "uncomfortable with some of Mrs. Gandhi's actions and certainly with those of her son" and that Indira Gandhi had apologized to Ahmed on behalf of Sanjay Gandhi for his rude remarks when the President declined to give a statement for the inaugural issue of his magazine, Surya.

Abu Abraham's cartoon and the rubber stamp presidency 
On 10 December 1975, a cartoon by Abu Abraham, which escaped the notice of the government censors, appeared in the Indian Express. The cartoon showed Ahmed, semi-naked and in a bathtub filled to its brim, handing over a paper he has signed to an outstretched hand of a person clothed in a formal suit and shirt. The speech balloon reads: “If there are any more ordinances, just ask them to wait.” The cartoon which lampooned Ahmed’s pliability in signing ordinances put before him became an iconic image of the Emergency. The cartoon irreparably damaged Ahmed’s image and legacy, and he is widely regarded as a rubber stamp President, who was willing to sign ordinances and the proclamation of Emergency put to him without questioning the government or asking it to be reconsidered. Subsequent Presidents of India who have been thought of as pliant and meekly submitting to the government of the day have been compared to Ahmed’s rubber stamp presidency.

State visits
President Ahmed made state visits to Indonesia, Hungary, Yugoslavia, Egypt, Sudan, Iran and Malaysia during his term in office. His visit to Saudi Arabia in March 1975 to attend the funeral of King Faisal was the first time an Indian President was personally present at the funeral of another head of state and the first visit by a senior Indian leader after Jawaharlal Nehru's visit in 1956. He was conferred with an honorary degree of Doctor of Law by the University of Pristina, Kosovo during his visit to Yugoslavia. During his state visit to Sudan in December 1975, Ahmed visited Juba in South Sudan, where he addressed the Regional Peoples' Assembly, in one of the earliest visits by an Indian dignitary to South Sudan.

Interest in sports 
Ahmed was a keen sportsman throughout his life and was an active golfer during his presidency. He was a centre-half in field hockey and played for the Combined Universities Hockey Team in Cambridge. For many years he was president of Assam’s State Football and Cricket Associations and served as the Vice-Chairman of the Assam Council of Sports and was later President of the All-India Lawn Tennis Federation. Ahmed is credited with reviving the Shillong Golf Club and resurrecting the mini golf course at the Rashtrapati Bhavan. Ahmed introduced the President’s Polo Cup as an open tournament in 1975 when he was the patron-in-chief of the Indian Polo Association. Discontinued in 2005, it has since 2013 been held as the President's Polo Cup Exhibition Match.

Death and burial 

On 10 February 1977, Ahmed who was on a three nation visit to Malaysia, Philippines and Burma flew back to New Delhi from Kuala Lumpur. He had been forced to curtail his official engagements in Malaysia due to ill health and was reportedly too weak to even attend a guard of honour arranged for him at the Kuala Lumpur airport. In the morning of 11 February, Ahmed, who had previously suffered heart attacks in 1966 and 1970 and whose health was described as being uncertain, was found lying unconscious in his bath in the Rashtrapati Bhavan. He was attended to by doctors but was declared dead at 8:52 a.m. having succumbed to a heart attack. He was India’s second president to die in office. Vice President B. D. Jatti was sworn in as the acting president within a few hours and thirteen days of national mourning declared with flags flying at half-mast.

Ahmed’s body lay in state in the Durbar Hall of the Rashtrapati Bhavan where common citizens, politicians, ministers and constitutional functionaries from various parties paid their respects to him. He was accorded a state funeral and buried in the grounds of the Jama Masjid near Parliament House on 13 February. Among the foreign dignitaries who attended his funeral were Lillian Carter, the mother of President Jimmy Carter, Prince Michael of Kent and   representing the Soviet Union. Ahmed’s death came amidst the campaigning for the General Elections of 1977 which were announced after Ahmed, on the advice of Prime Minister Indira Gandhi, had dissolved Parliament in January. In his address to the nation on Republic Day, 1977 Ahmed had called for an election campaign free of bitterness and rancor. Although his death brought a lull to the campaign, it was decided that the polls would be held in March 1977 as planned.

Tomb

Ahmed’s tomb was designed by the architect Habib Rahman and is situated in the garden of a mosque near Parliament House. Rahman was also the architect for the tomb of Dr. Zakir Hussain who was the first Muslim and the first President to die in office. The tomb is open to the sky and features thin framed marble jalis which are clamped with the help of internal pins onto structural elements made of steel. The tomb is a post-modern interpretation of traditional Islamic forms, an abstraction of the silhouette of the Taj Mahal, and its open linear forms make it an elegant and austere building and one of Delhi’s most remarkable pieces of modern architectural heritage.

Family
Ahmed was married to Begum Abida Ahmed and had two sons and a daughter with her. Begum is credited with having overhauled the presidential kitchen and ensuring Awadhi cuisine was included in its repertoire, as well as redecorating the rooms and upholstery of the Rashtrapati Bhavan. In the 1980s, she went on to become a two-term MP of the Indian National Congress from Bareilly, Uttar Pradesh. The elder of their sons, Parvez Ahmed, is a doctor who contested the General Elections of 2014 in the Barpeta constituency as a candidate of the Trinamool Congress party. Their other son, Badar Durrez Ahmed, served as a judge of the Delhi High Court and retired as Chief Justice of the Jammu and Kashmir High Court.

Commemoration 

Salute To The President Fakhruddin Ali Ahmed is a 1977 short documentary film directed by J. S. Bandekar and produced by the Films Division of India on the life and career of Ahmed. A commemorative postage stamp was issued by India Post in 1977. The Fakhruddin Ali Ahmed Medical College in Barpeta, Assam has been named after him, as was the Fakhruddin Ali Ahmed Committee, which works to promote Urdu, Arabic and Persian languages and the Fakhruddin Ali Ahmed Teachers Training College in Darbhanga, Bihar.

The Indian Council of Agricultural Research has since 1977 given out the Fakhruddin Ali Ahmed Award for scientists doing research in tribal and remote areas. In 2013, Ahmed was posthumously conferred the Bangladesh Liberation War Honour by the Government of Bangladesh in recognition of his role in helping Bangladesh win its independence.

Notes

References

Further reading
 Fakhruddin Ali Ahmed, by M. A. Naidu, 1975
 Fakhruddin Ali Ahmed, by Attar Chand. Pub. Homeland, 1975.
 
 Speeches of President Fakhruddin Ali Ahmed, Publications Division, Ministry of Information and Broadcasting, Govt. of India, 1980.
 My eleven years with Fakhruddin Ali Ahmed, by F. A. A. Rehmaney. S. Chand, 1979.

External links

 Legends of Assam 

Presidents of India
1905 births
1977 deaths
Alumni of St Catharine's College, Cambridge
St. Stephen's College, Delhi alumni
20th-century Indian Muslims
People from Barpeta district
Rajya Sabha members from Assam
Indian independence activists from Assam
Prisoners and detainees of British India
Indian National Congress politicians from Assam
Assam MLAs 1937–1946
Assam MLAs 1957–1962
Assam MLAs 1962–1967
India MPs 1967–1970
India MPs 1971–1977
Members of the Cabinet of India
Lok Sabha members from Assam
20th-century Indian lawyers
Education Ministers of India
Ministers of Power of India
Commerce and Industry Ministers of India
Burials in India
Members of the Inner Temple